Arrènes is a commune in the Creuse department in the Nouvelle-Aquitaine region in central France.

Geography

Population

Sights
 The church of St.Pierre, dating from the fifteenth century.
 Traces of a Benedictine priory dating from the fourteenth century.
 The fifteenth century Château de Sazeirat.
 The chapel de Reix, from the eighteenth century.

See also
Communes of the Creuse department

References

Communes of Creuse